The Orari River is a river of the south Canterbury region of New Zealand's South Island. It rises to the northwest of the Four Peaks Range, initially flowing north then east to circumnavigate the range before flowing southeast across the Canterbury Plains. The towns of Geraldine and Orari are both close to its banks. The river has been identified as an Important Bird Area by BirdLife International because it supports breeding colonies of the endangered black-billed gull.

See also
List of rivers of New Zealand

References

Rivers of Canterbury, New Zealand
Important Bird Areas of New Zealand
Rivers of New Zealand